Sofo Line is suburb of Kumasi. Kumasi is the regional capital of the Ashanti Region of Ghana.  It is both a residential and industrial area in the Kumasi Metropolitan Assembly. It is about 5 kilometres northwards from centre of the regional capital.

Notable place
Prempeh College a single-sexed second cycle school is in the town. It is a mission school under both the Methodist Church, Ghana and the Presbyterian Church, Ghana.

References

Populated places in Kumasi Metropolitan Assembly